Karen Margaryan (born 26 April 2001) is an Armenian weightlifter. He won the gold medal in the 77 kg event at the 2018 Summer Youth Olympics held in Buenos Aires, Argentina.

In 2019, at the European Junior & U23 Weightlifting Championships held in Bucharest, Romania, he won the bronze medal in the men's junior 81 kg Snatch event.

In 2021, he won the silver medal in the men's 81 kg event at the Junior World Weightlifting Championships held in Tashkent, Uzbekistan. At the 2021 European Junior & U23 Weightlifting Championships in Rovaniemi, Finland, he won the gold medal in his event.

References

External links 
 
 

Living people
2001 births
Place of birth missing (living people)
Armenian male weightlifters
Weightlifters at the 2018 Summer Youth Olympics
Youth Olympic gold medalists for Armenia
21st-century Armenian people